Vernacular architecture is building done outside any academic tradition, and without professional guidance.  This category encompasses a wide range and variety of building types, with differing methods of construction, from around the world, both historical and extant, representing the majority of buildings and settlements created in pre-industrial societies.  Vernacular architecture constitutes 95% of the world's built environment, as estimated in 1995 by Amos Rapoport, as measured against the small percentage of new buildings every year designed by architects and built by engineers.

Vernacular architecture usually serves immediate, local needs; is constrained by the materials available in its particular region; and reflects local traditions and cultural practices. Traditionally, the study of vernacular architecture did not examine formally schooled architects, but instead that of the design skills and tradition of local builders, who were rarely given any attribution for the work. More recently, vernacular architecture has been examined by designers and the building industry in an effort to be more energy conscious with contemporary design and construction—part of a broader interest in sustainable design.

As of 1986, even among scholars publishing in the field, the exact boundaries of "vernacular" have not been clear.

This issue of definition, apparently so simple, has proven to be one of the most serious problems for advocates of vernacular architecture and landscapes research. A straightforward, convincing, authoritative definition has not yet been offered. Vernacular architecture is a phenomenon that many understand intuitively but that few are able to define. The literature on the subject is thus filled with what might be called non-definitions. Vernacular architecture is non-high style building, it is those structures not designed by professionals; it is not monumental; it is un-sophisticated; it is mere building; it is, according to the distinguished historian Nikolaus Pevsner, not architecture. Those who take a more positive approach rely on adjectives like ordinary, everyday, and commonplace. While these terms are not as pejorative as other descriptive phrases that are sometimes applied to the vernacular, neither are they very precise. For example, the skyscrapers of Manhattan are works of high style architecture, but they are also commonplace in Manhattan. Are they not logically New York City vernacular buildings?

Vernacular architecture tends to be overlooked in traditional histories of design. It is not a stylistic description, much less one specific style, so it cannot be summarized in terms of easy-to-understand patterns, characteristics, materials, or elements. Because of the usage of traditional building methods and local builders, vernacular buildings are considered cultural expressions—aboriginal, indigenous, ancestral, rural, ethnic, or regional—as much as architectural artifacts.

Evolution of the phrase 

The term vernacular means 'domestic, native, indigenous', from verna 'native slave' or 'home-born slave'. The word probably derives from an older Etruscan word.

The term is borrowed from linguistics, where vernacular refers to language use particular to a time, place, or group.

The phrase dates to at least 1857, when it was used by Sir George Gilbert Scott, as the focus of the first chapter of his book "Remarks on Secular & Domestic Architecture, Present & Future", and in a paper read to an architectural society in Leicester in October of that year.  As a proponent of the Gothic Revival movement in England, Scott used the term as a pejorative to refer to the "prevailing architecture" in England of the time, all of it, as opposed to the Gothic he wanted to introduce.  In this "vernacular" category Scott included St Paul's Cathedral, Greenwich Hospital, London, and Castle Howard, although admitting their relative nobility.

The term was popularized with positive connotations in a 1964 exhibition at the Museum of Modern Art, New York, designed by architect Bernard Rudofsky, with a subsequent book.  Both were called Architecture Without Architects.  Featuring dramatic black-and-white photography of vernacular buildings around the world, the exhibition was extremely popular.  Rudofsky brought the concept into the eye of the public and of mainstream architecture, and also kept the definitions loose:  he wrote that the exhibition "attempts to break down our narrow concepts of the art of building by introducing the unfamiliar world of nonpedigreed architecture.  It is so little known that we don't even have a name for it.  For want of a generic label we shall call it vernacular, anonymous, spontaneous, indigenous, rural, as the case may be."  The book was a reminder of the legitimacy and "hard-won knowledge" inherent in vernacular buildings, from Polish salt-caves to gigantic Syrian water wheels to Moroccan desert fortresses, and was considered iconoclastic at the time.

The term "commercial vernacular" was popularized in the late 1960s by the publication of Learning from Las Vegas by Robert Venturi and Denise Scott Brown, referring to 20th-century American suburban tract and commercial architecture. 

Although vernacular architecture might be designed by people who do have some training in design, in 1971 Ronald Brunskill nonetheless defined vernacular architecture as:
...a building designed by an amateur without any training in design; the individual will have been guided by a series of conventions built up in his locality, paying little attention to what may be fashionable. The function of the building would be the dominant factor, aesthetic considerations, though present to some small degree, being quite minimal. Local materials would be used as a matter of course, other materials being chosen and imported quite exceptionally.

In the Encyclopedia of Vernacular Architecture of the World edited in 1997 by Paul Oliver of the Oxford Institute for Sustainable Development. Oliver argued that vernacular architecture, given the insights it gives into issues of environmental adaptation, will be necessary in the future to "ensure sustainability in both cultural and economic terms beyond the short term."  The encyclopedia defined the field of vernacular architecture as:
...comprising the dwellings and all other buildings of the people. Related to their environmental contexts and available resources they are customarily owner- or community-built, utilizing traditional technologies. All forms of vernacular architecture are built to meet specific needs, accommodating the values, economies and ways of life of the cultures that produce them.

In 2007 Allen Noble wrote a lengthy discussion of the relevant terms, in Traditional Buildings: A Global Survey of Structural Forms and Cultural Functions.  Noble concluded that "folk architecture" is built by "persons not professionally trained in building arts."  "Vernacular architecture" is "of the common people", but may be built by trained professionals, using local, traditional designs and materials. "Traditional architecture" is architecture passed down from person to person, generation to generation, particularly orally, but at any level of society, not just by common people.  "Primitive architecture" is a term Noble discourages the use of. The term popular architecture is used more in eastern Europe and is synonymous with folk or vernacular architecture.

Vernacular and the architect

Architecture designed by professional architects is usually not considered to be vernacular. Indeed, it can be argued that the very process of consciously designing a building makes it not vernacular. Paul Oliver, in his book Dwellings, states: "...it is contended that 'popular architecture' designed by professional architects or commercial builders for popular use, does not come within the compass of the vernacular". Oliver also offers the following simple definition of vernacular architecture: "the architecture of the people, and by the people, but not for the people."

Frank Lloyd Wright described vernacular architecture as "Folk building growing in response to actual needs, fitted into environment by people who knew no better than to fit them with native feeling". suggesting that it is a primitive form of design, lacking intelligent thought, but he also stated that it was "for us better worth study than all the highly self-conscious academic attempts at the beautiful throughout Europe".

Since at least the Arts and Crafts Movement, many modern architects have studied vernacular buildings and claimed to draw inspiration from them, including aspects of the vernacular in their designs. In 1946, the Egyptian architect Hassan Fathy was appointed to design the town of New Gourna near Luxor. Having studied traditional Nubian settlements and technologies, he incorporated the traditional mud brick vaults of the Nubian settlements in his designs. The experiment failed, due to a variety of social and economic reasons.

Sri Lankan architect Geoffrey Bawa is considered the pioneer of regional modernism in South Asia. Along with him, modern proponents of the use of the vernacular in architectural design include Charles Correa, a well known Indian architect; Muzharul Islam and Bashirul Haq, internationally known Bangladeshi architects; Balkrishna Doshi, another Indian, who established the Vastu-Shilpa Foundation in Ahmedabad to research the vernacular architecture of the region; and Sheila Sri Prakash who has used rural Indian architecture as an inspiration for innovations in environmental and socio-economically sustainable design and planning. The Dutch architect Aldo van Eyck was also a proponent of vernacular architecture. Architects whose work exemplifies the modern take on vernacular architecture would be Samuel Mockbee, Christopher Alexander and Paolo Soleri.

Oliver claims that:
As yet there is no clearly defined and specialized discipline for the study of dwellings or the larger compass of vernacular architecture. If such a discipline were to emerge it would probably be one that combines some of the elements of both architecture and anthropology with aspects of history and geography.

Architects have developed a renewed interest in vernacular architecture as a model for sustainable design. Contemporary complementary architecture is informed largely by vernacular architecture.

Influences on the vernacular

Vernacular architecture is influenced by a great range of different aspects of human behaviour and environment, leading to differing building forms for almost every different context; even neighbouring villages may have subtly different approaches to the construction and use of their dwellings, even if they at first appear the same. Despite these variations, every building is subject to the same laws of physics, and hence will demonstrate significant similarities in structural forms.

Climate
One of the most significant influences on vernacular architecture is the macro climate of the area in which the building is constructed. Buildings in cold climates invariably have high thermal mass or significant amounts of insulation. They are usually sealed in order to prevent heat loss, and openings such as windows tend to be small or even absent altogether. Buildings in warm climates, by contrast, tend to be constructed of lighter materials and to allow significant cross-ventilation through openings in the fabric of the building.

Buildings for a continental climate must be able to cope with significant variations in temperature, and may even be altered by their occupants according to the seasons. In hot arid and semi-arid regions, vernacular structures typically include a number of distinctive elements to provide for ventilation and temperature control. Across the middle-east, these elements included such design features as courtyard gardens with water features, screen walls, reflected light, mashrabiya (the distinctive oriel window with timber lattice-work) and bad girs (wind-catchers). 

Buildings take different forms depending on precipitation levels in the region – leading to dwellings on stilts in many regions with frequent flooding or rainy monsoon seasons. For example, the Queenslander is an elevated weatherboard house with a sloped, tin roof that evolved in the early 19th-century as a solution to the annual flooding caused by monsoonal rain in Australia's northern states. Flat roofs are rare in areas with high levels of precipitation. Similarly, areas with high winds will lead to specialised buildings able to cope with them, and buildings tend to present minimal surface area to prevailing winds and are often situated low on the landscape to minimise potential storm damage.

Climatic influences on vernacular architecture are substantial and can be extremely complex. Mediterranean vernacular, and that of much of the Middle East, often includes a courtyard with a fountain or pond; air cooled by water mist and evaporation is drawn through the building by the natural ventilation set up by the building form. Similarly, Northern African vernacular often has very high thermal mass and small windows to keep the occupants cool, and in many cases also includes chimneys, not for fires but to draw air through the internal spaces. Such specializations are not designed, but learned by trial and error over generations of building construction, often existing long before the scientific theories which explain why they work. Vernacular architecture is also used for the purposes of local citizens.

Culture
The way of life of building occupants, and the way they use their shelters, is of great influence on building forms. The size of family units, who shares which spaces, how food is prepared and eaten, how people interact and many other cultural considerations will affect the layout and size of dwellings.

For example, the family units of several East African ethnic communities live in family compounds, surrounded by marked boundaries, in which separate single-roomed dwellings are built to house different members of the family. In polygamous communities there may be separate dwellings for different wives, and more again for sons who are too old to share space with the women of the family. Social interaction within the family is governed by, and privacy is provided by, the separation between the structures in which family members live. By contrast, in Western Europe, such separation is accomplished inside one dwelling, by dividing the building into separate rooms.

Culture also has a great influence on the appearance of vernacular buildings, as occupants often decorate buildings in accordance with local customs and beliefs.

Nomadic dwellings

There are many cultures around the world which include some aspect of nomadic life, and they have all developed vernacular solutions for the need for shelter. These all include appropriate responses to climate and customs of their inhabitants, including practicalities of simple construction such as huts, and if necessary, transport such as tents.

The Inuit have a number of different forms of shelter appropriate to different seasons and geographical locations, including the igloo (for winter) and the tupiq (for summer). The Sami of Northern Europe, who live in climates similar to those experienced by the Inuit, have developed different shelters appropriate to their culture including the lavvu and goahti. The development of different solutions in similar circumstances because of cultural influences is typical of vernacular architecture.

Many nomadic people use materials common in the local environment to construct temporary dwellings, such as the Punan of Sarawak who use palm fronds, or the Ituri Pygmies who use saplings and mongongo leaves to construct domed huts. Other cultures reuse materials, transporting them with them as they move. Examples of this are the tribes of Mongolia, who carry their gers (yurts) with them, or the black desert tents of the Qashgai in Iran. Notable in each case is the significant impact of the availability of materials and the availability of pack animals or other forms of transport on the ultimate form of the shelters.

All the shelters are adapted to suit the local climate. The Mongolian gers (yurts), for example, are versatile enough to be cool in hot continental summers and warm in the sub-zero temperatures of Mongolian winters, and include a close-able ventilation hole at the centre and a chimney for a stove. A ger is typically not often relocated, and is therefore sturdy and secure, including wooden front door and several layers of coverings. A traditional Berber tent, by contrast, might be relocated daily, and is much lighter and quicker to erect and dismantle – and because of the climate it is used in, does not need to provide the same degree of protection from the elements.

Permanent dwellings

The type of structure and materials used for a dwelling vary depending on how permanent it is. Frequently moved nomadic structures will be lightweight and simple, more permanent ones will be less so. When people settle somewhere permanently, the architecture of their dwellings will change to reflect that.

Materials used will become heavier, more solid and more durable. They may also become more complicated and more expensive, as the capital and labour required to construct them is a one-time cost. Permanent dwellings often offer a greater degree of protection and shelter from the elements. In some cases however, where dwellings are subjected to severe weather conditions such as frequent flooding or high winds, buildings may be deliberately "designed" to fail and be replaced, rather than requiring the uneconomical or even impossible structures needed to withstand them. The collapse of a relatively flimsy, lightweight structure is also less likely to cause serious injury than a heavy structure.

Over time, dwellings' architecture may come to reflect a very specific geographical locale.

Environment, construction elements and materials
The local environment and the construction materials it can provide, govern many aspects of vernacular architecture. Areas rich in trees will develop a wooden vernacular, while areas without much wood may use mud or stone. In early California redwood water towers supporting redwood tanks and enclosed by redwood siding (tankhouses) were part of a self-contained wind-powered domestic water system. In the Far East it is common to use bamboo, as it is both plentiful and versatile. Vernacular, almost by definition, is sustainable, and will not exhaust the local resources. If it is not sustainable, it is not suitable for its local context, and cannot be vernacular.

Construction elements and materials frequently found in vernacular buildings include:
 Adobe – a type of mud brick, often covered with white-wash, commonly used in Spain and Spanish colonies
 Cob – a type of plaster made from subsoil with the addition of fibrous material to give added strength
 Mashrabiya (also known as shanashol in Iraq) – a type of oriel window with timber lattice-work, designed to allow ventilation, commonly found in Iraq and Egypt in upper-class homes
 Mud bricks – loam or sand mixed with water and vegetable matter such as straw
 Rammed earth often used in foundations
 Saddleback roof
 Thatch – dry vegetation used as roofing material
 Windcatcher – a type of chimney used to provide natural ventilation without the use of air conditioning, commonly found in Iran, Iraq and other parts of the Middle-East
 Wychert – a blend of white earth and clay

Legal aspects
As many jurisdictions introduce tougher building codes and zoning regulations, "folk architects" sometimes find themselves in conflict with the local authorities.

A case that made news in Russia was that of an Arkhangelsk entrepreneur Nikolay P. Sutyagin, who built what was reportedly the world's tallest single-family wooden house for himself and his family, only to see it condemned as a fire hazard. On December 26, 2008, the tower was pulled down, and the remainder was dismantled manually over the course of the next several months.

Gallery

Africa

Anatolia

Central Asia

Middle East

South Asia

Far East Asia

Southeast Asia and Austronesia

Australia and New Zealand

Europe

North America

South America

Types and examples by region

Inter-regional
 Bender tent – a temporary dwelling used by Nomadic people 
 Stilt house – a raised house found in monsoonal regions, especially monsoonal South Asia or other areas prone to flooding

Brazil
 Bustee – a dwelling made from waste materials, often associated with the slums of India or the favellas of Brazil

Canada
 Canadian Railway style, Railway stations built in Canada in the 19th and early 20th centuries were often simple wood structures that lacked decorative features. Some of these stations survive today but not as active railway stations.

Iraq
 Desert castles – (in Arabic, known as q'sar) fortified palaces or castles built during the Umayyad period, the ruins of which are now scattered across the semi-arid regions of north-eastern Jordan, Syria, Israel, Palestine and Iraq. These often served as hunting lodges for noble families.
 Mudhif – a traditional building constructed entirely of reeds and common to the Marsh Arabs of southern Iraq. Many were destroyed by Saddam Hussein, but since 2003, Arab communities have been returning to their traditional homes and way of life.

Germany
 Gulf house
 Low German house
 Middle German house
 Old Frisian farmhouse

Indonesia

Israel
 Sukkah – a temporary dwelling for use during the Jewish holiday of Sukkot. A sukkah must be made of organic materials, have three walls, and must have a roof that is partially open to the sky. The roof is typically made of branches or thatch.
 Four room house- Iron Age structures constructed of mud and stone. 
 Wild Bau cladding style- the practice of repurposing rubble from Israeli structures destroyed during wars and terrorist attacks in masonry, especially in Katamon.

Italy
 Alpine 'barn' houses (dwellings built on the storey above the ground floor, which housed cattle during winter
 Dammuso (Dammusu) dry stone housing of Pantelleria
 Sassi di Matera – cave dwellings
 Trullo – dry stone hut-shaped house with a conical roof

Norway

Philippines
 Torogan sleeping house in Mindanao, Philippines

Scotland

 Bastle house – a multi-storey, fortified farmhouse with sophisticated security measures designed to provide defense against the frequent raiding parties along the Scottish border.
 Blackhouse – a traditional dry-stone wall building, roofed with thatch of turf, a flagstone floor and central hearth, designed to accommodate livestock and people, separated by a partition.
 Crofters cottage – a simple construction of stone walls filled with earth for insulation, a thatched or turf roof and stone slabs were set into the middle of the room for a peat fire which provided some form of central heating. An unusual croft house Brotchie's Steading, Dunnet was built with whale bone couples.
 Cruck house – a medieval structure designed to cope with shortages of long-span timber. The frame of the structure uses "siles" or "couples" (a type of fork) for the end walls. The walls do not support the roof, which is instead carried on the cruck frame. This type of building is common throughout England, Scotland and Wales, although only a few intact examples have survived. 
 Shieling – a type of temporary hut (or a collection of huts) constructed of stone, sod and turf used as a dwelling during the Summer months when highlanders took their livestock to higher ground in search of new pasture.
 Tower house or peel tower – a medieval building, typically of stone, constructed by the aristocratic classes as a defensible residence.
 Turf house – e.g. East Ayrshire, Medieval turf house

Spain
 Adobe house - mudbrick buildings found in Spain and Spanish colonies

United States
Creole architecture in the United States - a type of house or cottage common along the Gulf Coast and associated rivers, especially in southern Louisiana and Mississippi. 
Vernacular Architecture of Rural and Small-Town Missouri, by Howard Wight Marshall
Earth lodge -a subterranean dwelling used by the Native Americans of the Great Plains
Hogan –traditional dwelling of Navajo people
Earl A. Young (born March 31, 1889 – May 24, 1975) was an American architect, realtor and insurance agent. Over a span of 52 years, he designed and built 31 structures in Charlevoix, Michigan but was never a registered architect. He worked mostly in stone, using limestone, fieldstone, and boulders he found throughout Northern Michigan. The homes are commonly referred to as gnome homes, mushroom houses, or Hobbit houses. His door, window, roof and fireplace designs were very distinct because of his use of curved lines. Young's goal was to show that a small stone house could be as impressive as a castle. Young also helped make Charlevoix the busy, summer resort town that it is today.

Ukraine

Different regions in Ukraine have their own examples of vernacular architecture. For example, in the Carpathian Mountains and the surrounding foothills, wood and clay are the primary traditional building materials. Ukrainian architecture is preserved at The Museum of Folk Architecture and Way of Life of Central Naddnipryanshchyna located in Pereiaslav, Ukraine.

See also

Indigenous architecture

House types:
 A-frame house
 Barabara (Aleut)
 Bastle house (England, Scotland)
 Beehive house (Bantu, Africa)
 Bender tent
 Blackhouse
 Bothy
 Bungalow 
 Burdei (Romania, Ukraine)
 Cabana (structure) 
 Chalet (Alpine regions of Europe) 
 Clochán (Ireland)
 Cruck house
 Earth lodge (American Indian)
 Four room house (ancient Israel and Judah)
 Gulf house (East Frisia and North Germany)
 Half-timbered construction
 Hall house
 Hut
 Icelandic turf houses
 Igloo
 Khmer house
 Log cabin
 Longhouse
 Low German house
 List of human habitation forms
 List of house types
 Machiya Japan
 Malay houses traditional houses of Bahasa people of Malaya
 Mitato (Greece)
 Mountain hut
 Mudhif
 Nakamal (Vanuatu)
 Nipa hut (Philippines)
 Oast house
 Oca (structure) (Brazil)
 Old Frisian farmhouse (The Netherlands and North German Plain)
 Orri (France)
 Peel tower (England, Scotland)
 The Queenslander (Australia)
 Rondavel (Central and South Africa)
 Rumoh Aceh indigenous architecture of Aceh, Indonesia
 Sheiling
 Shotgun house
 Sod house
 Stilt house
 Tipi
 Torogan (Philippines)
 Tower house (Scotland, Spain and mountainous regions) 
 Trullo
 Wharenui, a Māori longhouse (New Zealand)
 Wigwam
 Yaranga
 Yurt (Central Asia)

Architectural elements
 Dormer window
 Mashrabiya (also known as shanashel in Iraq)
 Oriel window
 Windcatcher (bad girs in Arabic)

Building techniques and materials:

 Bundwerk construction method used in Austria, Tyrol and Bavaria
 Cob (material)
 Grouted roof
 Pierrotage (French infill material)
 Sod roof
 Stilts (architecture)
 Thatch
 Veranda (Australia)
 Wattle and daub

Organizations:
 Vernacular Architecture Forum
 Architecture, SUST
 International Network for Traditional Building, Architecture & Urbanism

Regional vernacular architecture: 
 Architecture in early modern Scotland#Vernacular architecture in Early modern Scotland
 Baita (architecture) Alpine regions of Europe
 Balinese architecture Bali, Indonesia
 Batak architecture Indigenous architecture of the people of Sumatra, Indonesia
 Creole architecture in the United States
 Estonian vernacular architecture
 European medieval architecture in North America
 Indian vernacular architecture
 Kanak traditional architecture
 Mar del Plata style
 Scottish Vernacular
 Shophouse (South-East Asia)
 Traditional architecture of Enggano (Indonesia)
 Vernacular architecture in Indonesia
  Rustic architecture of the United States
 Vernacular architecture of the Carpathians
 Vernacular architecture of old Riyadh (Saudi Arabia)
 Vernacular architecture in Norway
 Vernacular architecture of Ukraine
 Vernacular residential architecture of Western Sichuan
 Vernacular architecture of Spain
Examples:
 Al-Mashrabiya Building
 Broken Angel House
 Ethel S. Roy House
 Machiya – traditional Japanese wooden town houses 
 Phonehenge West
 Slow architecture
 Watts Towers
 Witch window
People:
 Laurie Baker
 Geoffrey Bawa
 Rifat Chadirji
 Bashirul Haq
 Saiful Haq
 Friedensreich Hundertwasser
 Howard Moffitt
 Mudéjar
 Dan Phillips
 Kea Tawana

References

Sources and further reading
 Large format.

 Clifton-Taylor pioneered the study of the English vernacular.

 Glassie, Henry. "Architects, Vernacular Traditions, and Society" Traditional Dwellings and Settlements Review, Vol 1, 1990, 9-21

 Mark Jarzombek, Architecture of First Societies: A Global Perspective, (New York: Wiley & Sons, August 2013)

 Carl Pruscha, Austrian architect and United Nations-UNESCO advisor to the government of Nepal, lived and worked in the Himalayas 1964–74. He continued his activities as head of the design studio "Habitat, Environment and Conservation" at the Academy of Fine Arts in Vienna.

 Schittich, Christian, ed. (2019). Vernacular Architecture: Atlas for Living Throughout the World. Basle: Birkhäuser. 
Upton, Dell and John Michael Vlach, eds. Common Places: Readings in American Vernacular Architecture. Athens, Georgia: University of Georgia Press, 1986. .
Wharton, David. "Roadside Architecture." Southern Spaces, February 1, 2005,

External links

 Centre for Vernacular Architecture-Bangalore-India
 Vernacular Architecture Forum
 Vernacular Architecture Examples at GreatBuildings
 Vernacular Architecture and Landscape Architecture Research Guide – Environmental Design Library, University of California, Berkeley
 Himalayan Vernacular Architecture - Technische Universität Berlin
 DATs Fachwerk interiors (Germany)

 
Folklore